Sir Lewis Richardson, 1st Baronet, CBE (2 February 1873 – 2 April 1934) was a British-born South African businessman.

Born in Birmingham, he went to Cape Colony in 1881. He was head of the firm L. Richardson & Co.

He was created a CBE in 1919, knighted in 1921, and a baronet, of Yellow Woods in the Province of the Cape of Good Hope in South Africa, in 1924.

See also 

 Richardson baronets

References 

1873 births
1934 deaths
Emigrants from the United Kingdom to Cape Colony
20th-century South African businesspeople
South African Commanders of the Order of the British Empire
South African Knights Bachelor
Baronets in the Baronetage of the United Kingdom